Wilfred G. Shuchat (9 June 1920 – 27 December 2018) was a Canadian scholar and rabbi.

Biography
Shuchat was born in Montreal, Canada, and studied at McGill University, receiving his BA in 1941. He was ordained at the Jewish Theological Seminary of America in 1945, which institution also awarded him an honorary D.D. in 1971. He served as rabbi in Albany, New York, at the Congregation Sons of Israel and after that in Buffalo at Temple Beth El. He then moved to Montreal and served as rabbi at the Congregation Shaar Hashomayim, and later became rabbi emeritus.

One of his career highlights was conceiving and consulting on the Pavilion of Judaism at 1967 International and Universal Exposition in Montreal, known as Expo 67.

He has published a number of influential books; among them The Gate of Heaven: The Story of Congregation Shaar Hashomayim in Montreal (2000) and The Creation According to Midrash Rabbah (2002). He is one of the founders of the Union for Traditional Judaism, an organization that promotes traditional Jewish observance within the framework of Conservative Judaism.

Shuchat's son, Rabbi Dr. Raphael Shuchat, is a writer and lecturer in Jewish philosophy and mysticism at Bar-Ilan and Hebrew universities in Israel. Shuchat died in December 2018 at the age of 98.

Works

References

1920 births
2018 deaths
20th-century Jewish theologians
21st-century Jewish theologians
Canadian Jewish theologians
Jewish Theological Seminary of America people
McGill University alumni
20th-century American rabbis
21st-century American Jews
Union for Traditional Judaism